Quantemol Ltd is based in University College London initiated by Professor Jonathan Tennyson FRS and Dr. Daniel Brown in 2004. The company initially developed a unique software tool, Quantemol-N, which provides full accessibility to the highly sophisticated UK molecular R-matrix codes, used to model electron polyatomic molecule interactions. Since then Quantemol has widened to further types of simulation, with plasmas and industrial plasma tools, in Quantemol-VT in 2013 and launched in 2016 a sustainable database Quantemol-DB, representing the chemical and radiative transport properties of a wide range of plasmas.

Quantemol-N 

The Quantemol-N software system has been developed to simplify use of UK R-matrix codes. It provides an interface for non specialists to perform ab initio electron-molecule scattering calculations. Quantemol-N calculates a variety of observables for electron molecule collisions including:
 Elastic cross sections
 Electronic excitation cross sections
 Electron impact dissociation rates
 Resonance parameters
 Radial charge density calculation
 Dissociative electron attachment cross sections
 Ionisation cross sections
 Differential cross sections
 Momentum transfer cross sections
 Vibrational excitation cross sections

Applicable simulations 
Quantemol-N is capable of tackling a variety of problems;
 Closed shell molecules
 Open shell molecules, and radicals
 Neutral and positively charged species
 Molecules of up to 17 atoms. (Neopentane has been successfully simulated, with improvements allowing more atoms in the future, and rapid movement towards Biomolecules)

Accuracy 

A study on the key benchmark molecule; water, gave results more accurate than obtainable experimentally (Faure et al. 2004).

Experimentally, there are problems measuring large cross sections at low angles; this applies to any molecule with a large dipole moment. Being a simulation, this is not a problem for Quantemol-N.

Relevant Publications 
 Quantemol-N: an expert system for performing electron molecule collision calculations using the R-matrix method
 Jonathan Tennyson, Daniel B. Brown, James J. Munro, Iryna Rozum, Hemal N. Varambhia and Natalia Vinci
 Journal of Physics: Conference Series 86, 012001 (2007)
 doi: 1742-6596/86/1/012001
 Calculations of Cross Sections Data for Scattering of Electrons on HBr
 Radmilovic-Radjenovic M., Petrovic Z.L.,
 Acta Physica Polonica A, 117 (2010),745-747
 Electron-impact rotational excitation of the carbon monosulphide (CS) molecule
 Varambhia H. N., Faure A., Graupner K., et al.
 Monthly Notices of the Royal Astronomical Society, 403 (2010), 1409-1412
 Cross-sections for the scattering of electrons with BF3
 M. Radmilovic-Radjenovic, H. N. Varambhia, M. Vranic, J. Tennyson, Z. Lj. Petrovic.
 Publ. Astron. Obs. Belgrade No. 84 (2008), 57-60
 R-matrix calculations of low-energy electron alkane collisions
 Hemal N. Varambhia, James J. Munro and Jonathan Tennyson
 International Journal of Mass Spectrometry, 271, 1-7 (2008)
 Electron collision with the HCN and HNC molecules using the R-matrix method
 Hemal N. Varambhia and Jonathan Tennyson
 Journal of Physics B: Atomic, Molecular and Optical Physics, 40, 1211-1223 (2007)
 Tool opens door to quantum modelling
 29 March 2005, by Harry Yeates, Electronics Weekly
 Quantemol-N from plasma etch and lasers to earth's ionosphere
 15 March 2005, III-Vs Review

Quantemol-EC 

Quantemol-Electron Collisions is a python-based software enabling calculations of electron-molecule scattering cross sections using a suite of up to date R-matrix codes (UKRMol+) and other methods such as Binary Encounter Bethe (BEB) model, BEf- scaling and dissociative electron attachment cross-section estimation. It was launched in 2019 and its major differences from Quantemol-N are the use of UKRMol+ instead of UKRMol and utilising Molpro software for molecular target setups. These changes resulted in higher accuracy of calculations and improved usability as molecular geometry optimisation/generation and symmetry identification is performed by Molpro.

Quantemol-EC calculates a variety of observables for electron molecule collisions including:
 Elastic cross sections
 Electronic excitation cross sections
 Super-elastic/Quenching/De-excitation cross sections
 Electron impact dissociation (subject to a target molecule's specifics)
 Scattering reaction rate
 Arrhenius parameters for reaction rates
 Resonance parameters
 Estimate dissociative electron attachment
 Differential cross sections
 Momentum transfer cross sections
 Electron impact ionisation at all energies
 Rotational excitation cross sections

Applicable simulations 

In the same way as Quantemol-N, Quantemol-EC can be used for closed-shell and open-shell molecules, radicals, neutral and positively charged species.

Relevant Publications 

 Cooper, B., Tudorovskaya, M., Mohr, S., O’Hare, A., Hanicinec, M., Dzarasova, A., … Tennyson, J. (2019). Quantemol Electron Collisions (QEC): An Enhanced Expert System for Performing Electron Molecule Collision Calculations Using the R-matrix Method. MDPI AG. 
 Benda, J., Masin, Z., Gorfinkiel, J. D., Harvey, A. J.,  & Tennyson, J., UKRmol+: A suite for modelling of electronic processes in molecules interacting with electrons, positrons and photons using the R-matrix method, Computer Physics Communications. 
 Werner, H.-J., Knowles, P. J., Knizia, G., Manby, F. R., & Schütz, M. (2011). Molpro: a general-purpose quantum chemistry program package. Wiley Interdisciplinary Reviews: Computational Molecular Science, 2(2), 242–253. 
 Tennyson, J. (2010). Electron–molecule collision calculations using the R-matrix method. Physics Reports, 491(2–3), 29–76.
 
For resonance fits:  
  Tennyson, J., & Noble, C. J. (1984). RESON – A program for the detection and fitting of Breit-Wigner resonances. Computer Physics Communications, 33(4), 421–424.
For calculating electron attachment:
 Munro, J. J., Harrison, S., Fujimoto, M. M., & Tennyson, J. (2012). A dissociative electron attachment cross-section estimator. Journal of Physics: Conference Series, 388(1), 12013.
For calculating Binary Encounter Bethe (BEB) model:
 Kim, Y.-K., & Rudd, M. E. (1994). Binary-encounter-dipole model for electron-impact ionization. Physical Review A, 50(5), 3954–3967. 
For calculating BE-f Scaling:
 Kim, Y.-K. (2001). Scaling of plane-wave Born cross sections for electron-impact excitation of neutral atoms. Physical Review A, 64(3).

Quantemol-VT 

Quantemol-Virtual Tool is an expert software system for the simulation of industrial plasma processing tools. Q-VT builds upon the comprehensively validated Hybrid Plasma Equipment Model (HPEM) codes developed by renowned plasma physicist Professor Mark Kushner for simulating non-equilibrium low pressure (up to 1 Torr) plasma processes. Q-VT includes an intuitive user interface, data visualisation and analysis capabilities, and convenient job/batch management.

Applications include:

 Tool design and development
 Modelling of discharge and wafer level chemistry kinetics
 Model etch/deposition uniformity
 Examine tilting effects (when used with additional feature scale profile model, specifically compatible with Synopsys software)
 Large wafer size simulation (12 inch and more)

What Q-VT can model:

 Plasma tool geometry alterations
 Advanced volume and surface chemistries
 Variation of key plasma state variables with process parameter changes
 Ion flux on wafer level: ion energy/ angular distribution functions, and fluxes of all species along the wafer
 Non-Maxwellian electron dynamics
 Complex electromagnetic plasma interactions (current coils, permanent magnets, multi-frequency power supply, plasma circuit interactions)

Benefits of Q-VT

 Experimentally validated simulation system
 Experimentally validated simulation system focused on modelling plasma tools
 User-friendly tool-like interface
 Sets of validated plasma chemistries and cross-sections are provided with the licence
 Example libraries include numerous chambers
 Easy-to-use drawing tool for chamber design and modification: a tool simulation set-up service can be provided
 Ability to model complex plasma phenomena with additional modules (dust/radiation transport, ion kinetics, external circuits, etc.)
 Multi-run management system for managing large numbers of simulations
 Advanced reactor scale visualisation of scalar and vector plasma properties
 Experimental results importing
 Ability to easily distribute and manage jobs over a cluster

Quantemol-DB 
The Quantemol database (QDB or Quantemol-DB) is a database of plasma processes developed by Quantemol Ltd at University College London in 2016. The database contains chemistry data for plasma chemistry modelling with pre-assembled and validated chemistry sets, and is updated by Quantemol and contributing users. A peer-reviewed article detailing the database and service was published in 2017.
 One of the most challenging aspects in plasma modelling is insufficient chemistry data. The purpose of QDB is to provide a forum for collaborative effort between academia and industrial research to access, compare and improve the understanding of plasma chemistry sets influencing plasma behaviour.

Approach to validation 
The principles established for the validation of chemistry sets are that:
 There is experimental bench-marking from open sources (where available) and also directly provided by industrial partners (collaborating on the Powerbase project) and database contributors.
 Calculations are performed for a range of models thereby reflecting the underlying quality of input data (example models used for validation include HPEM, Global_Kin, ChemKin).
 The models used to produce the data are validated on a case-by-case basis.
 Numerical uncertainties are quantified with thresholds set for validation where possible.
This methodology is specifically applied to atomic and molecular calculations using the principles established in the publication "Uncertainty Estimates of Theoretical Atomic and Molecular Data", which was produced for the International Atomic Energy Agency and focused on "data that are most important for high-temperature plasma modeling" with the "ultimate goal to develop guidelines for self-validation of computational theory for A+M [Atomic and Molecular] processes".

It is recognised that while the validation of chemistry sets directly may still be uncertain, the validation of data produced by models using this data will often be more easily obtained.

QDB users are invited to validate chemistry sets either directly or by validating the results of models which use these chemistry sets as inputs. Validation of the chemistry sets provided in the database will be based on the foundations of Uncertainty Quantification for calculations of complex systems.

For chemistry simulation, the scaling law based on the parameter study is a common methodology for this validation. For higher dimensional simulation, the behaviour of the species and the surface will be used for comparison.

Referencing is provided for users downloading chemistry sets, to ensure that relevant citations to chemistry set and validating experiments are included and can be used for publications.

Validation of Individual Chemistry Reactions 
Rate coefficients of each reaction are included in the validated chemistry set for a similar range of temperature and pressure.

The main validation method for individual reactions is compared with alternative theoretical calculations/estimations and experimental measurements. For unknown reactions different calculation methods are used:
 Quantemol-N (R-matrix method) calculations for electron molecule scattering reactions  
 Scaling law, mathematical methods of estimation and expert opinion to estimate necessary data  
 Quantum and Transition State Theory for unknown heavy particle reactions

API feature 

The Application Programming Interface (API) is a set of protocols and tools for linking the database with plasma modelling software Quantemol-VT.  An API specifies how software components should interact and APIs are used when chemistries can be accessible in the graphical user interface (GUI) of the plasma modelling software.

Surface Processes 

The database has a library of sticking coefficients for atomic oxygen, atomic fluorine, fluorocarbons, and silane radicals. For surface mechanisms such as specific etches, the database provides a set of individual reactions with their associated probabilities. For energy-dependent reactions, the formula and the value of the used parameters are provided.

Dynamic Chemistry app 

This application helps to gather data which is already in Quantemol-DB related to feedstock gases of the plasma and assemble a new chemistry set and preferred format for downloading or running a Global Model or Boltzmann Solver.

Global Model 

The online global model calculates the reactor averaged particle densities and the electron temperature for a given set of process parameters in plasma. 
The model is solving equations:
Particle density balance for heavy species
Charge neutrality
Electron energy density balance

The output includes volume average densities of species and electron temperature. 
Calculations can be set up for both pre-assembled and self-generated chemistry sets using the Dynamic Chemistry app.

Detailed documentation can be found here.

Boltzmann Solver 

The Boltzmann Solver is based on the formalism described in S. D. Rockwood, "Elastic and Inelastic Cross Sections for Electron-Hg Scattering from Hg Transport Data", Physical Review A 8, 2348-2358 (1973) and it was extended to a non-uniform energy grid.

The solver calculates EEDFs, effective electron temperature, and rate coefficients for electron collisions in the chemistry set for a gas temperature of choice, suitable for discharges with non-Maxwellian distributions.

Calculations can be set up for both pre-assembled and self-generated chemistry sets using the Dynamic Chemistry app.

Current chemistry sets

See also

References

External links 
 Quantemol Official Site
 Quantemol-N: an expert system for performing electron molecule collision calculations using the R-matrix method
 Calculations of Cross Sections Data for Scattering of Electrons on HBr
 Electron-impact rotational excitation of the carbon monosulphide (CS) molecule
 Cross-sections for the scattering of electrons with BF3
 R-matrix calculations of low-energy electron alkane collisions
 Electron collision with the HCN and HNC molecules using the R-matrix method
 Tool opens door to quantum modelling
 Quantemol-N from plasma etch and lasers to earth's ionosphere
 Global plasma simulations using dynamically generated chemical models

University College London